William Thomas "Bill" Mills (1924 – October 9, 2011) was a business owner and politician in Ontario, Canada. He served as mayor of Kingston from 1959 to 1964.

The son of William and Beatrice Mills, he was educated at Queen's University. Mills operated an office supplies business. He served in the Royal Canadian Air Force during World War II. He was married to Thelma Byron around 1948.

Mills ran for mayor again in 1967, losing to incumbent George Speal. He was an unsuccessful candidate for the Kingston seat in the Ontario assembly, losing to Syl Apps.

In 2010, he suffered an attack of pneumonia followed by two heart attacks in hospital. Mills died at home in Kingston the following year.

References 

1924 births
2011 deaths
Mayors of Kingston, Ontario
Royal Canadian Air Force personnel of World War II